Olutoyosi "Toyosi" Tajudeen Oludamilola Olusanya (born 14 October 1997) is an English footballer who plays as a forward for Arbroath on loan from St Mirren.

He started his professional career at AFC Wimbledon and scored on his debut. After a loan spell at Kingstonian in late 2016, Olusanya trialled with Chelsea, Reading, Wolverhampton Wanderers and Cheltenham Town before joining Walton Casuals. He joined Fleet Town in February 2018 before a move to Gosport Borough a month later.

Club career

Youth 
Olusanya started his youth career with Mass between the ages of 11 and 14, before a year-long spell at Palace Guard. He later joined 10 Coaching as part of a college scheme, and was spotted by AFC Wimbledon while looking at a teammate.

AFC Wimbledon 
In 2015, Olusanya joined AFC Wimbledon. He was a key member of the club's 2015–16 FA Youth Cup run that saw them reach the fifth Round.

Having featured in a 4–0 victory over Woking in the First Round, he netted both goals in the club's 2–0 victory over Ebbsfleet United in the Second Round. Olusanya also played against Watford, Newcastle United and Chelsea in the ensuing rounds. He was rewarded with a professional deal in February 2016.

On 7 May 2016, he made his Football League debut as a 73rd minute substitute against Newport County. Olusanya scored his first goal for the club seven minutes later, being bought down in the box before converting the penalty.

Kingstonian (loan) 
In November 2016, he joined Isthmian League Premier Division club Kingstonian on a one-month loan. He made his debut in a 1–1 FA Trophy draw with Tonbridge Angels on 12 November, and marked his league debut a week later. He made seven appearances for the club, the majority coming from the bench, before his return to AFC Wimbledon in December.

Trials 
In April 2017, Olusanya joined Premier League side Chelsea on trial, having impressed in their previous FA Youth Cup meeting. Reports suggested Manchester City also took an interest in the forward after his cup performances.

In July 2017, Olusanya was listed as a member of the Reading Under-23 squad. A month later he joined Wolverhampton Wanderers on trial. In October 2017, he joined Cheltenham Town on trial.

Walton Casuals 
On 2 December 2017, he joined Isthmian League South Division club Walton Casuals with the club out of striking options due to injuries. He made his debut in the same day in a league fixture at South Park. On 5 December, he scored his first goal for the club in a 3–0 victory against Sittingbourne. He made a further five appearances for the club before falling out of favour.

Fleet Town 

In February 2018, Olusanya joined Southern League Division One East club Fleet Town. On 3 February, he made his debut in a 3–2 defeat at Uxbridge. Olusanya scored his first goal for the club in an 8–1 North Hants Cup win against Tadley Calleva Reserves on 20 February. Two weeks later, he scored his first league goal in defeat to Ashford Town and was named Man of the Match. Olusanya also scored on his final appearance for the club in a 4–2 victory against Thame United on 17 March.

Gosport Borough 

On 23 March 2018, Olusanya joined Southern League Premier Division club Gosport Borough. He made his début for Gosport as a second-half substitute in a 5–1 defeat at Hereford the following day.

Middlesbrough 
Olusanya joined Championship club Middlesbrough in August 2021.  On 25 August 2021, he made his debut in the 1-1 draw against Blackburn Rovers at the Riverside Stadium, coming on from the bench after 67 minutes.

St Mirren
On 17 June 2022, Olusanya joined Scottish Premiership club St Mirren on a two-year deal.

On 25 January 2023 he joined Scottish Championship club Arbroath on loan until the end of the season.

Personal life
Born in England, Olusanya is of Nigerian descent through his parents. He grew up in Peckham, with 2 of his younger siblings

Career statistics

References

External links
[]

1998 births
Living people
Footballers from Lambeth
English footballers
English people of Nigerian descent
Association football midfielders
AFC Wimbledon players
Kingstonian F.C. players
Walton Casuals F.C. players
Fleet Town F.C. players
Gosport Borough F.C. players
Billericay Town F.C. players
Middlesbrough F.C. players
St Mirren F.C. players
Arbroath F.C. players
English Football League players
Isthmian League players
Southern Football League players
National League (English football) players
Scottish Professional Football League players